The Hunger Games film series is composed of science fiction dystopian adventure films, based on The Hunger Games trilogy of novels by American author Suzanne Collins. The films are distributed by Lionsgate and produced by Nina Jacobson and Jon Kilik. The series feature an ensemble cast including Jennifer Lawrence as Katniss Everdeen, Josh Hutcherson as Peeta Mellark, Liam Hemsworth as Gale Hawthorne, Woody Harrelson as Haymitch Abernathy, Elizabeth Banks as Effie Trinket, Stanley Tucci as Caesar Flickerman, and Donald Sutherland as President Snow.

The first three films set various box office records. The Hunger Games (2012) set records for the opening day and the biggest opening weekend for an original IP. Catching Fire (2013) set the record for biggest opening weekend of November. Mockingjay – Part 1 (2014) had the largest opening day and weekend of 2014. The films, including Mockingjay – Part 2 (2015), were praised for their themes and Lawrence's performance.

The Hunger Games is the 21st-highest-grossing film franchise of all time, having grossed over US$2.97 billion worldwide.

A prequel film, titled The Hunger Games: The Ballad of Songbirds and Snakes, based on the eponymous novel, is set to be released on November 17, 2023.

Background
Following the release of Suzanne Collins's novel The Hunger Games, on September 14, 2008, Hollywood film studios began looking to adapt the book into film. In March 2009, Color Force, an independent studio founded by producer Nina Jacobson, bought the film rights to the book. She then sought out production company Lionsgate to help her produce the film. Collins was also attached to adapt the novel; she began the first draft after completing the third novel in the series, Mockingjay (2010). The search for a director began in 2010 with three directors in the running; David Slade, Sam Mendes, and Gary Ross. Ross was ultimately chosen to direct. By the time Collins had finished the script, Ross decided to go through the script with Collins and screenwriter Billy Ray.

In October 2010, scripts were sent to the actors, and casting occurred between March and May 2011. The first role cast was of the protagonist, Katniss Everdeen. As many as thirty actresses were in talks to play the part, with Jennifer Lawrence, Hailee Steinfeld, Abigail Breslin, and Chloë Grace Moretz being mentioned most. The role was given to Lawrence.

The roles of Peeta Mellark, Katniss' fellow tribute, and Gale Hawthorne, her best friend, began casting later that month. Top contenders for Peeta included Josh Hutcherson, Alexander Ludwig (later cast as Cato), Hunter Parrish, Evan Peters, and Lucas Till. Contenders for Gale included Robbie Amell, Liam Hemsworth, David Henrie, and Drew Roy. On April 4, it was reported that Hemsworth had been cast as Gale, and Hutcherson had been cast as Peeta.

Films

The Hunger Games (2012)

Every year, in the ruins of what was once North America, the Capitol of the nation of Panem forces each of the 12 districts to send a boy and girl tribute between the ages of 12 and 18 to compete in the Hunger Games: a nationally televised event in which the 'tributes' fight each other to the death until one survivor remains. When Primrose Everdeen is "reaped," her older sister Katniss volunteers in her place as tribute to enter the games and is forced to rely upon her sharp instincts and knowledge when she's pitted against highly trained and fierce "tributes" from all of the other districts and has to think quickly on her feet to survive.

The Hunger Games: Catching Fire (2013)

Along with fellow District 12 victor Peeta Mellark, Katniss Everdeen returns home safely after winning the 74th Annual Hunger Games. Winning means that they must leave their loved ones behind and embark on a Victory Tour throughout the districts for a couple of days. Along the way Katniss senses a rebellion simmering upon the Capitol - one that she and Peeta may have sparked  - but the Capitol is still under control as President Snow prepares for the 75th Hunger Games - the Third Quarter Quell - that could change Panem forever. Past victors will be reaped in the 75th Hunger Games, the Third Quarter Quell.

The Hunger Games: Mockingjay (2014–2015)

Part 1 (2014) 

Following her rescue from the devastating Quarter Quell, Katniss Everdeen awakes in the complex beneath the supposedly destroyed District 13. Her home, District 12, has been reduced to rubble by the Capitol. Peeta Mellark was kidnapped by the Capitol and is now brainwashed and being held captive by President Snow. Snow wants Peeta to forget everything he had loved about Katniss. At the same time, Katniss also learns about a secret rebellion spreading throughout Panem - a rebellion that places her at the center of attention, and compels her to turn the tables on President Snow.

Part 2 (2015) 

Realizing the stakes are no longer just for survival, Katniss Everdeen teams up with her closest friends, Peeta Mellark, Gale Hawthorne, and Finnick Odair, on the ultimate mission for peace. Together, they leave District 13, to liberate citizens from a war that tears Panem apart more than ever. President Snow becomes obsessed with destroying Katniss Everdeen and everyone and everything she loves. Ahead lie mortal traps, dangerous enemies, and moral choices that will determine the future of millions.

The Hunger Games: The Ballad of Songbirds and Snakes (2023)

In August 2017, Lionsgate CEO Jon Feltheimer expressed interest in spin-offs of The Hunger Games, with intentions to create a writers room to explore the concept. In June 2019, Chairman of the Lionsgate Motion Picture Group Joe Drake, announced that the company is communicating and working closely with Suzanne Collins in options to adapt the prequel to the original trilogy, The Ballad of Songbirds and Snakes, which was released on May 19, 2020.

By April 2020, a film adaptation was announced to be officially in development. Francis Lawrence will return as director, with a script written by Michael Arndt, from a story adaptation by Suzanne Collins. Nina Jacobson will return as producer, alongside Brad Simpson. The project will be developed by Color Force, and distributed by Lionsgate. In August 2021, Drake stated that the film was expected to start production during the first half of 2022 for a projected late 2023 or early 2024 release date, and was reportedly in pre-production. In April 2022, it was revealed that the film would be released on November 17, 2023. In June 2022, filming for the film began in Berlin with Tom Blyth and Rachel Zegler shooting their roles.

Cast and crew

Additional crew

Production

Development
Filming for the franchise began on May 23, 2011, and finished on June 20, 2014.

Suzanne Collins and Louise Rosner acted as executive producers on the first two films. Other executive producers of the first film include Robin Bissell and Shantal Feghali. Co-producers are Diana Alvarez, Martin Cohen, Louis Phillips, Bryan Unkeless, and Aldric La'auli Porter. Color Force and Lionsgate collaborated on all four films. It was announced on November 1, 2012, that the studio had decided to split the final book, Mockingjay (2010), into two films: The Hunger Games: Mockingjay – Part 1 (2014) and The Hunger Games: Mockingjay – Part 2 (2015), much like Harry Potter and the Deathly Hallows – Part 1 (2010) and 2 (2011), and The Twilight Saga: Breaking Dawn – Part 1 (2011) and 2 (2012).

Directors
Gary Ross directed the first film (The Hunger Games), and despite initially stating otherwise on April 10, 2012, Lionsgate announced that Ross would not return to direct the sequel. On April 19, 2012, it was confirmed that Francis Lawrence would direct the sequel instead, and on November 1, 2012, it was confirmed that Lawrence would return and direct the final two films in the series, based on the novel Mockingjay.

Scripts
Suzanne Collins began adapting the first book to film after she finished writing Mockingjay. Collins had experience in writing screenplays after writing Clifford's Puppy Days and other children's television shows. When Gary Ross was announced as director for the film in 2010, he began to work with Collins and veteran writer Billy Ray to bring the novel to life. After Francis Lawrence took over as director, he brought in Simon Beaufoy and Michael Arndt to write the script for Catching Fire. The final two films of the series were written by Danny Strong and Peter Craig.

Casting

Once the three leads were cast, casting shifted to the other tributes. Jack Quaid was cast as Marvel, Leven Rambin as Glimmer, Amandla Stenberg as Rue, and Dayo Okeniyi as Thresh. Alexander Ludwig (who auditioned for Peeta) was cast as Cato, Isabelle Fuhrman (who auditioned for Katniss) as Clove, and Jacqueline Emerson as Foxface. Following the casting of tributes, the adult cast began to come together. Elizabeth Banks was cast as Effie Trinket, the District 12 escort. Woody Harrelson was cast as Haymitch Abernathy, District 12's mentor. Lenny Kravitz was cast as Cinna, Katniss' stylist. Wes Bentley was cast as game maker Seneca Crane. Stanley Tucci was cast as Caesar Flickerman, Panem's celebrity host. Donald Sutherland was cast as Coriolanus Snow, Panem's president. Willow Shields was cast as Primrose Everdeen, Katniss' younger sister.

In July 2012, the cast for the second film was announced. Jena Malone would play Johanna Mason. Philip Seymour Hoffman would play Plutarch Heavensbee, Sam Claflin would play Finnick Odair. It was later announced that Jeffrey Wright was cast as Beetee, Alan Ritchson as Gloss, Lynn Cohen as Mags, and Amanda Plummer as Wiress.

In August and September 2013, it was revealed that Stef Dawson would play Annie Cresta, Natalie Dormer would play Cressida, Evan Ross would play Messalla, and Julianne Moore would play President Alma Coin in the final two films.

In May 2022, it was announced that Tom Blyth was cast as the younger version of Coriolanus Snow in the prequel film. Later the same month, Rachel Zegler was cast in the role of Lucy Gray Baird. The following month, Josh Andrés Rivera, Hunter Schafer and Jason Schwartzman were cast in the roles of Sejanus Plinth, Tigris Snow and Lucretius "Lucky" Flickerman  respectively.

Filming
Principal photography for The Hunger Games began on May 24, 2011, and concluded on September 15, 2011. Charlotte, NC was used for the Capitol scenes. An abandoned village in Hickory, NC was the filming location for District 12. The arena scenes were filmed on the outskirts of Wilmington, NC.

Principal photography for The Hunger Games: Catching Fire began on September 10, 2012, in Atlanta, Georgia and concluded in April 2013. In November 2012, production moved to Hawaii to film the arena scenes. Filming took a Christmas break before filming resumed for two weeks in mid-January. In March 2013, the film went back to Hawaii for re-shoots. Atlanta was used for all Capitol scenes. Hawaii for the arena scenes, and Oakland, New Jersey, for District 12 scenes.

Principal photography for The Hunger Games: Mockingjay began on September 23, 2013 and concluded on June 20, 2014. Majority of filming for the Mockingjay films was filmed in soundstages in a studio in Atlanta, until April 18, 2014. Production then moved to Paris, with filming beginning there on May 5, 2014.

Philip Seymour Hoffman, who portrays Plutarch Heavensbee, died on February 2, 2014. At the time of his death, he had completed filming his scenes for The Hunger Games: Mockingjay – Part 1 and had a week left of shooting for Part 2. Lionsgate released a statement stating that, since the majority of Hoffman's scenes were completed, the release date for Part 2 would not be affected.

Reception

Box office performance

All the Hunger Games films finished first at the North American box office during both their opening and second weekend. In North America, The Hunger Games film series is the second highest-grossing film series based on young adult books, after the Harry Potter series, earning over $1.4 billion. The Hunger Games are the most watched film series on Netflix, making it to the Top 10 Movies List charting for the streaming service in 2023.

Worldwide, it is the third highest-grossing film series based on young-adult books after the film series of Harry Potter and The Twilight Saga, respectively, having grossed over $2.9 billion. In North America, it is the eighth highest-grossing film franchise of all time. Worldwide, it is currently (11 April 2022) the 21st highest-grossing film franchise of all time.

Critical and public response

Each  installment of the Hunger Games series received positive reviews from critics. The first two installments (notably the second) were critically acclaimed, while the last two films were met with generally positive  responses from critics. All The Hunger Games films received a "Fresh Rating" (>60%) on the review aggregation website Rotten Tomatoes, with the first two films receiving a "Certified Fresh" rating (>75%).

Accolades

Music

Soundtracks

Singles
 "Safe & Sound"
 "Eyes Open"
 "Atlas"
 "We Remain"
 "Elastic Heart"
 "Who We Are"
 "Everybody Wants to Rule the World"
 "Meltdown"
 "All My Love"
 "Yellow Flicker Beat"
 "The Hanging Tree"

See also
 Battle Royale (film)
 Battle royale genre

References

Further reading 
  Pdf .

External links

 

 
Adventure film series
Film series introduced in 2012
Lionsgate films
Lionsgate franchises
Science fiction film series
Films set in North America
Films based on science fiction novels
Action film series
Films about death games